The Farmers' Loan and Trust Company was a national bank headquartered in New York City that later became Citibank.

History
On February 28, 1822, the New York State Legislature granted a charter to the Farmers' Fire Insurance and Loan Company with capital stock of $500,000 which could be increased to $1,000,000 "when expedient". At the first meeting of the board of directors on March 9, 1822, John T. Champlin, the largest individual stockholder, was chosen president and served until his death in 1830. In 1836, its name was changed to the Farmers' Loan and Trust Company.

In 1879, Roswell G. Rolston served as president and George F. Talman was vice president. The members of the executive committee of the board of directors were Moses Taylor (president of National City Bank), John Jacob Astor III, Isaac Bell Jr. (a cotton broker who was the U.S. Minister to the Netherlands), Talman, Samuel Sloan (president of the Delaware, Lackawanna and Western Railroad), Edward Minturn (of Grinnell, Minturn & Co.), and Rolston. In 1880, Robert Lenox Kennedy (a nephew of James Lenox) replaced Minturn on the executive committee.

Mergers
On June 1, 1929, the Farmers' Loan and Trust Company merged with the National City Bank where National City Bank took over the expanded bank's banking operations, while Farmers' Trust became the City Bank-Farmers Trust Company, an affiliate subsidiary of National City Bank, that took over the trust operations. Two years later, the Trust Company merged with the Bank of America Trust Company to become New York's largest financial institution. 

In February 1940, the company, as trustee, purchased the Hotel Knickerbocker on West 42nd Street in Manhattan at auction for $742,500 in foreclosure proceedings against the Kerback Realty Corporation and others. In 1942, the firm celebrated its 120th anniversary.

In January 1959, the shareholders approved a name change from City Bank Farmers Trust Company to First National City Trust Company which involved a shift of the trust company's status from that of a state-chartered to a national bank. In 1963, the company merged into the First National City Bank (which itself was a result of the 1955 merger of the National City Bank and the First National Bank into The First National City Bank of New York; which was shortened to First National City Bank in 1962). In 1976, the First National City Bank's name was changed to Citibank, N.A.

Company headquarters

The company's first office was a private dwelling at 34 Wall Street. Upon the completion of the Merchant's Exchange Building in 1827, Farmers' moved its headquarters there, remaining until the Great Fire of New York destroyed the building in 1835. After renting office space since its inception, the company purchased a plot of land in 1882 for $120,000 on William Street and built a two and a half story building which it used as its headquarters from 1889 until 1890. In February 1889 it purchased the adjacent plot for $250,000 and built a new building occupying 16-22 William Street at a total construction cost of $1,064,159.19 for the old and new building. By 1908, the business had again outgrown its space so it purchased the property of the Delaware, Lackawanna and Western Railroad Company for $625,000 at the corner of William and Exchange Place, north and west of the plots already owned by the company. The new building was completed in 1909 at a cost of $1,476,037.84.

Between 1930 and 1931, the bank tore down its existing headquarters, and built a new fifty-nine story structure known as the City Bank-Farmers Trust Building at 20 Exchange Place, which became one of New York City's tallest buildings. The steel-framed structure sheathed in granite and limestone was designed in the Art Deco style by Cross & Cross. The building served as the company's headquarters until 1956 and the City Bank-Farmers Trust Building was eventually sold by Citigroup in 1979.

Notable employees
List of Presidents:
 1822–1830: John T. Champlin
 1830–1832: Oliver H. Hicks
 1832–1832: Frederick A. Tracy
 1832–1835: Elisha Tibbets
 1835–1837: Henry Seymour
 1837–1842: Lewis Curtis
 1842–1842: Charles Stebbins
 1842–1845: Robert C. Cornell
 1845–1865: Douw D. Williamson
 1865–1898: Rosewell G. Rolston
 1898–1921: Edwin S. Marston
 1921–1929: James H. Perkins
 1936–1951: Lindsay Bradford
 1951–1957: Richard S. Perkins
1957–1959: Eben W. Pyne

Other notable employees:
 Archibald McIntyre; Secretary (1822–1823)
 Rufus King Delafield; Secretary (1836–1852)
 Samuel Sloan Jr.; Secretary (1897–1907), Vice-President (1907)
 William B. Cardozo

References
Notes

Sources

Works cited

External links

Banks based in New York City
Defunct banks of the United States
1822 establishments in New York (state)
1959 disestablishments in New York (state)
Defunct banks of New York City